Kırıkhan is a town and district in the northeastern part of Hatay Province, Turkey. The name Kırıkhan means "broken inn" in the Turkish language, perhaps a reference to one of the many lodgings that once lined the road. The town stands at the intersection of the route between İskenderun and Aleppo, and the major east-west road between Antakya and Kahramanmaraş.

The town was once part of the district of Belen, but became a district in its own right in 1923 at the time of the French Mandate. Kırıkhan was annexed to Turkey in 1939 with the rest of Hatay.

It covers an area of 687.73 km2, with an average summer temperature of 32.3 °C and an average winter temperature of 7.31 °C.

The district’s major religious and touristic site is the Beyazid-i Bestami Külliyesi (Complex) on Darb-ı Sak Castle at Alabeyli village, which contains the tomb or maqam of Bayazid Bastami.

Notable Residents 

 Nerses Pozapalian was born in the town in 1937.

See also 
 Trapessac

References

Populated places in Hatay Province
Districts of Hatay Province
Towns in Turkey